Erythrolamprus  torrenicola, the velvety swamp snake, is a species of snake in the family Colubridae. The species is found in Venezuela.

References

Erythrolamprus
Reptiles of Venezuela
Endemic fauna of Venezuela
Reptiles described in 1991